The First Lyons ministry (United Australia) was the 20th ministry of the Government of Australia. It was led by the country's 10th Prime Minister, Joseph Lyons. The First Lyons ministry succeeded the Scullin ministry, which dissolved on 6 January 1932 following the federal election that took place on 19 December which saw the UAP defeat James Scullin's Labor Party. The ministry was replaced by the Second Lyons ministry on 12 October 1934 following the 1934 federal election.

Allan Guy, who died in 1979, was the last surviving Assistant Minister of the First Lyons ministry. John Latham was the last surviving Cabinet minister.

Ministry

Assistant ministers

References

Ministries of George V
Lyons, 1
1932 establishments in Australia
1934 disestablishments in Australia
Cabinets established in 1932
Cabinets disestablished in 1934